A total solar eclipse will occur on May 31, 2068. A solar eclipse occurs when the Moon passes between Earth and the Sun, thereby totally or partly obscuring the image of the Sun for a viewer on Earth. A total solar eclipse occurs when the Moon's apparent diameter is larger than the Sun's, blocking all direct sunlight, turning day into darkness. Totality occurs in a narrow path across Earth's surface, with the partial solar eclipse visible over a surrounding region thousands of kilometres wide.

Related eclipses

Solar eclipses 2065–2069

Saros 148

Tritos series

Metonic series

Notes

References 

2068 05 31
2068 05 31
2068 05 31
2068 in science